Keilor North is a suburb in Melbourne, Victoria, Australia,  north-west of Melbourne's Central Business District, located with the City of Brimbank local government area. Keilor North recorded a population of 67 at the 2021 census.

It is identified as one of Melbourne's areas of natural significance. Its close proximity to the Organ Pipes National Park along with its environs overlay, known as the Green Wedge, means that many threatened and rare grass species are found in the area.

Golfers can play at the Keilor Public Golf Course on the Calder Highway.

See also
 City of Keilor – Keilor North was previously within this former local government area..

References

Suburbs of Melbourne
Suburbs of the City of Brimbank